State Route 240 (SR 240) is a  long north-south state highway in Lawrence County, Tennessee. Except for a short stretch in Summertown, the entire route of SR 240 is known simply as Turnpike.

Route description

SR 240 begins as Turnpike just west of Deerfield at an intersection with US 64/SR 15. It goes northeast along the southern edge of Laurel Hill Wildlife Management Area to pass through farmland and have a short concurrency with SR 241 before passing through Henryville, where it has an intersection with SR 242. The highway then crosses the Buffalo River passes through a mix of farmland and wooded areas before entering Summertown, where it turns east to have a concurrency with SR 20 before turning south along Monument road and coming to an end at an intersection with US 43/SR 6. The entire route of SR 240 is a two-lane highway.

Major intersections

y

References

240
Transportation in Lawrence County, Tennessee